James Wasley (born 19 July 1979) is a former Australian rules footballer who played with Collingwood in the Australian Football League (AFL).

Wasley played in a variety of positions for Collingwood, after arriving from Norwood in the 1997 AFL Draft. He start out as a half forward flanker and wingman but was also used as a defender.

He had a terrible run with injuries during his time in the AFL, which started in 1998 when he suffered stress fractures in his foot. In 1999 he injured a knee and then had shoulder problems in 2000. An ankle injury kept him out of the team for the entire 2001 AFL season and he was delisted by Collingwood.

References

External links
 
 

1979 births
Australian rules footballers from South Australia
Collingwood Football Club players
Norwood Football Club players
Living people